Santa Teresa High School (also referred to as STHS) is a public high school located in the suburban Santa Teresa neighborhood of southern San Jose, California. The school is a member of the East Side Union High School District and serves students from grades 9 through 12. The average student enrollment is 2,300 students, with an average ratio of 25 students for every teacher.

History 
The main campus of Santa Teresa High School was constructed in 1967 and officially opened on July 1, 1974, . The school added a new bond-funded multi-purpose building in 2010 in addition to solar panels over the parking lots.

The campus is also home to Phoenix High School, an alternative high school and member of the ESUHSD. Phoenix is housed within four portable buildings and a classroom in the 800 building of STHS. Phoenix is supervised by Santa Teresa High School staff members.

Academics and student life 
Santa Teresa High School has roughly 2,300 students, both male and female, and spans 9th through 12th grades. The average ratio at STHS is 25 students for every teacher. STHS serves as magnet school for ESUHSD and offers a specialty program in multimedia arts. As of the 2015–16 school year, STHS offered 21 Advanced Placement courses to its student body and 32% of the students enrolled in one or more of those courses. Between 2011 and 2015, STHS students dropped out at a lower rate and graduated at a higher rate compared to others in East Side Union High School District and the state of California. The U.S. News & World Report ranked STHS as the 275th best high school in California, and 1,512th nationally, for 2016.

Santa Teresa is home to over 50 student clubs on campus. Officially recognized student clubs include American Red Cross, California Scholarship Federation, FBLA-PBL, Interact, Key Club, Mathematics, Engineering, Science Achievement, Model United Nations, National Honor Society, and UNICEF. STHS is supported by a number of community organizations to assist the student body. Organized in 2004, the Santa Teresa Parent Teacher Organization, the school's Parent-Teacher Association, serves to advance the academic and social programs offered at STHS. The Santa Teresa Music and Arts Association, a school booster club, offers a performing arts curriculum with an emphasis on drama and band. The Santa Teresa Athletic Boosters Club is a non-profit which fundraisers to provide revenue to assist the athletic teams of STHS.

Athletics 
The Saints, as the athletics teams of Santa Teresa High School are known, compete in CIF Central Coast Section's Blossom Valley Athletic League. From 1974 through Winter 2011, the Saints have won a combined 55 CCS championships. Additionally, Santa Teresa was home to two California state champions: the 1985 Girls 800-meter (Kristen Dowell) and the 1990 boys 800-meter (Craig Magness) runs. Santa Teresa has historical rivalries with Oak Grove High School and Leland High School.

Soccer is a prominent sport for the school and the girls' team has been nationally ranked. Between 1987 and 1991, former student-athlete Keri Sanchez lettered in five different sports for the Saints and appeared for the United States women's national soccer team as a senior. She was named the San Jose Mercury News soccer player of the year in 1991 and the High School Athlete of the Decade for the 1980s. Paul Bravo is also a former player for the Saints.  Santa Teresa's ladies soccer team has won Central Coast Section (CCS) championships in 1987, 1991, 2000, 2001, and co-champions with Woodside in 2013. They also made appearances in the CCS finals 2002, 2003 and 2005.

The boys basketball team won the CCS title in 2011.

Several football players made it to the NFL including Rich Campbell, Joe Nedney and Craig Whelihan.  The most successful season for the team was 1987, when they lost to Live Oak High School in the CCS Championship final. In 2022, the football team won their first CCS title.

Sports offered

Fall 
 Cross Country (co-ed)
 Football (boys)
 Golf (girls)
 Tennis (girls)
 Volleyball (girls)
 Water Polo (co-ed)

Winter 
 Basketball (boys and girls)
 Soccer (boys and girls)
 Wrestling (co-ed)

Spring 
 Badminton (co-ed)
 Baseball (boys)
 Golf (boys)
 Softball (girls)
 Swimming and Diving (co-ed)
 Tennis (boys)
 Track and Field (co-ed)
 Volleyball (boys)

Notable alumni and faculty 
 Doug Borgel, former indoor soccer player and coach
 Paul Bravo, former United States men's national soccer team and Major League Soccer player
 Michael Burry, hedge fund manager and physician
 Rich Campbell, former National Football League quarterback
 Todd Clever, former captain of the United States national rugby union team and former United States national rugby sevens team player
 James P. Delgado, Maritime archaeologist and author
 Chon Gallegos, former National Football League quarterback
 Bob LaMonte, sports agent
 Tegan McGrady, United States women's national soccer team and National Women's Soccer League player
 Gabe Morales, Major League Baseball umpire
 Joe Nedney, former National Football League kicker
 Randy Prescott, former indoor soccer player
 Keri Sanchez, former United States women's national soccer team player
 Craig Whelihan, former National Football League and Arena Football League quarterback

See also 
 Santa Clara County high schools

References

External links 
 Official website
 Santa Teresa High School on California Department of Education
 Santa Teresa Parents and Teachers Organization website
 Santa Teresa Music and Arts Association website

East Side Union High School District
High schools in San Jose, California
Public high schools in California
1974 establishments in California